Bastards is the fifth and final studio album by the band Saigon Kick. The album was only released in the Far East and Japan.

Track listing 

 "A Lot Like You" - 3:41
 "Jehovah" - 4:29
 "Meet Your Maker" - 3:49
 "Break My Heart" - 4:00
 "Sign of the Times" - 3:18
 "So Sad to Say" - 4:15
 "Solitary Jerk" - 3:23
 "We Never Met" - 4:12
 "Who's Crying Now" - 3:45
 "Big Shot" (Billy Joel cover) - 3:52)
 "Nearer" - 3:52

Personnel 

 Jason Bieler - lead vocals, guitar, programming
 Pete Dembrowski - guitar, programming
 Chris McLernon - bass on 10, 11
 Rick Sanders - drums on 1-10
 Phil Varone - drums on 11

References

Saigon Kick albums
1999 albums